A network operations center (NOC, pronounced like the word noc), also known as a "network management center", is one or more locations from which network monitoring and control, or network management, is exercised over a computer, telecommunication or satellite network.


History
The earliest NOCs started during the 1960s. A Network Control Center was opened in New York by AT&T in 1962 which used status boards to display switch and routing information, in real-time, from AT&T's most important toll switches. AT&T later replaced this Network Control Center with a modernized NOC in 1977, located in Bedminster, New Jersey.

Purpose
NOCs are implemented by business organizations, public utilities, universities, and government agencies that oversee complex networking environments that require high availability. NOC personnel are responsible for monitoring one or many networks for certain conditions that may require special attention to avoid degraded service. Organizations may operate more than one NOC, either to manage different networks or to provide geographic redundancy in the event of one site becoming unavailable.

In addition to monitoring internal and external networks of related infrastructure, NOCs can monitor social networks to get a head-start on disruptive events.

Networking environments

Computer
Computer environments can range in size from one to millions of servers.

Telecommunication
In telecommunication environments, NOCs are responsible for monitoring power failures, communication line alarms (such as bit errors, framing errors, line coding errors, and circuits down) and other performance issues that may affect the network, and in telecom sector have to track details about the call flow.

Satellite
Satellite network environments process large amounts of voice and video data, in addition to intelligence, surveillance and reconnaissance information. Example organizations that manage this form of NOC includes Artel, a service provider of commercial satellite bandwidth to the United States Department of Defense, located in Herndon, Virginia.

Design
NOCs are frequently laid out with several rows of desks, all facing a video wall, which typically shows details of highly significant alarms, ongoing incidents and general network performance; a corner of the wall is sometimes used for showing a news or weather TV channel, as this can keep the NOC technicians aware of current events which may affect the network or systems they are responsible for. The back wall of a NOC is sometimes glazed; there may be a room attached to this wall which is used by members of the team responsible for dealing with serious incidents to meet while still able to watch events unfolding within the NOC. Individual desks are generally assigned to a specific network, technology or area. A technician may have several computer monitors on their desk, with the extra monitors used for monitoring the systems or networks covered from that desk. The location housing a NOC may also contain many or all of the primary servers and other equipment essential to running the network, although it is not uncommon for a single NOC to monitor and control a number of geographically dispersed sites.

Personnel

NOC engineers
A NOC engineer has several duties in order to ensure the smooth running of the network. They deal with things such as DDoS attacks, power outages, network failures, and routing black-holes. There are of course the basic roles, such as remote hands, support, configuration of hardware (such as firewalls and routers, purchased by a client). NOC engineers also have to ensure the core network is stable. This can be done by configuring hardware in a way that makes the network more secure, but still has optimal performance. NOC engineers are also responsible for monitoring activity, such as network usage, temperatures etc. They would also have to install equipment, such as KVMs, rack installation, IP-PDU setup, running cabling. The majority of NOC engineers are also on call and have a five or six day rotation, working different shifts.

See also
 Central apparatus room
 Control room
 Data center
Data center management
 Internet exchange point
 Master control
 NetOps
 Security operations center
 Information security operations center

References

External links
 What is a NOC

Rooms
Network management